Michael Biddulph, 1st Baron Biddulph JP DL (17 February 1834 – 6 April 1923), was a British banker and Liberal, later Liberal Unionist, Member of Parliament (MP).

Early life
Biddulph was the eldest son of Robert Biddulph and his wife Elizabeth (née Palmer), daughter of George Palmer MP, of Nazeing Park in Essex. Among his siblings was Sir Robert Biddulph, a General in the Army, Colonel John Biddulph, who served in India, and George Tournay Biddulph, who also worked for the family banking firm. After his mother's death, his father married his second cousin, Lady Sarah Wilfreda Palmer, daughter of Earl Selborne and they lived at Douglas House, Petersham.

Biddulph was educated at Harrow.

Career
He was a partner in the London banking firm of Cocks, Biddulph and Co. In 1865 he was elected to the House of Commons for Herefordshire, a seat he held until 1885, and then represented Ross between 1886 and 1900. At first a Liberal, he disagreed with William Ewart Gladstone on the issue of Irish Home Rule and sat as a Liberal Unionist after 1886. Biddulph was also a Justice of the Peace for Herefordshire and Gloucestershire and served as Deputy Lieutenant of Herefordshire. In 1903 he was raised to the peerage as Baron Biddulph, of Ledbury in the County of Hereford.

Personal life
On 9 August 1864, Biddulph married, firstly, Adelaide Georgiana Peel (d. 1872), the second daughter of General Jonathan Peel MP (fifth son Sir Robert Peel, 1st Baronet) and Lady Alicia Jane Kennedy (a daughter of Archibald Kennedy, 1st Marquess of Ailsa), in 1864. They had two sons and three daughters, including:

 John Michael Gordon, 2nd Baron Biddulph (1869–1949), who married Marjorie Caroline Susan Mure, third daughter of Lt.-Col. William Mure MP, and Constance Elizabeth Wyndham (fourth daughter of George Wyndham, 1st Baron Leconfield) in 1896.
 Claud William Biddulph (1871–1954), who married his second cousin once removed Margaret Howard, the only daughter of Alfred John Howard of Warton Hall, and Mary Alice Kennedy, in 1906.
 Adela Margaret Mary Biddulph (d. 1876), who died young.
 Edith Mary Biddulph (d. 1939), who married Charles Wentworth Bell of Bronsil (d. 1929), in 1891.
 Violet Maud Biddulph (d. 1960).

After her death in 1872 he married, secondly, Lady Elizabeth Philippa (née Yorke) Adeane, widow of Henry John Adeane MP for Cambridgeshire, in 1877. Lady Elizabeth was the eldest daughter of Charles Yorke, 4th Earl of Hardwicke, and Susan Liddell (sixth daughter of Thomas Liddell, 1st Baron Ravensworth). They had no children.

Lady Biddulh died on 13 January 1916. Lord Biddulph died in April 1923, aged 89, and was succeeded in the barony by his eldest son from his first marriage, John. Lady Biddulph died in 1916, aged 81.

References

External links 
 

www.thepeerage.com

Biddulph, Michael Biddulph, 1st Baron
Biddulph, Michael Biddulph, 1st Baron
People educated at Harrow School
Biddulph, Michael Biddulph, 1st Baron
Liberal Party (UK) MPs for English constituencies
Liberal Unionist Party MPs for English constituencies
UK MPs 1865–1868
UK MPs 1868–1874
UK MPs 1874–1880
UK MPs 1885–1886
UK MPs 1886–1892
UK MPs 1892–1895
UK MPs 1895–1900
UK MPs who were granted peerages
Gentlemen Ushers
Deputy Lieutenants of Herefordshire
Peers created by Edward VII